Patrick Roche may refer to:

 Patrick Roche (athlete) (1886–1917), British sprinter
 Patrick Roche (Wisconsin politician) (1821–?), Wisconsin farmer and politician
 Patrick Roche (Northern Ireland politician) (born 1940), Unionist politician in Northern Ireland